The Hobart Masonic Hall is a historic building located in the village of Hobart in Delaware County, New York, United States. It was originally constructed in 1889 as a meeting hall for St. Andrews Lodge No. 289 of Freemasons, although it is no longer used for that purpose.

The building is a -story wood-frame building on a rubble stone foundation in the Stick-Eastlake style.  The building is rectangular in shape with a small cross gable wing on the west elevation. 

Currently the building houses a local history museum, operated by the Hobart Historical Society.
It was listed on the National Register of Historic Places in 2001.

See also
National Register of Historic Places listings in Delaware County, New York

References

External links
 Hobart Historical Society

National Register of Historic Places in Delaware County, New York
Former Masonic buildings in New York (state)
History museums in New York (state)
Historical society museums in New York (state)
Museums in Delaware County, New York
Queen Anne architecture in New York (state)
Masonic buildings completed in 1889